Tilloy-lès-Conty (literally Tilloy near Conty) is a former commune in the Somme department in Hauts-de-France in northern France. On 1 January 2019, it was merged into the new commune Ô-de-Selle.

Geography

Population

Places of interest
 The seventeenth century church of Notre-Dame

Château de Tilloy-lès-Conty
This is the ancient fief of the seigneurs of the Croy family, restored as a country house at the end of the 17th century.  It consists of a garden and a 9-hectare park, with a little English garden filled with 165 varieties of roses.

The gardens of the Pic-Vert
A 6000-square-metre garden built by Michel Driencourt around a large 19th-century Picardie farm, in four sections:
 A shady garden with old Japanese cherry trees
 An inner courtyard
 An old orchard and vegetable garden
 A conservatory of ancient varieties
2500 varieties of shrubs and perennials are on show with collections of delphinium, iris, poppies, magnolia, hydrangea and Japanese maples.

See also
Communes of the Somme department

References

Former communes of Somme (department)
Populated places disestablished in 2019